Ulken Kamkaly ("Big Kamkaly") is a lake in the Sarysu District, Jambyl Region, Kazakhstan.

Shyganak village is located by the northern end of the lakeshore and Zhailaukol village  to the east. There is fishing in the lake.

Geography
Ulken Kamkaly lies at the northern edge of the Moiynkum Desert, in the lower Chu river basin. To the northwest lies smaller lake Kishi Kamkaly. A narrow sound at the northern tip connects both lakes. There are other smaller lakes scattered in the area, such as Shortankol  to the WSW and Sorasha  to the WNW. Ulken Kamkaly freezes in the winter and the ice thaws by March.

See also
List of lakes of Kazakhstan

References

External links
Chu-Talas, Kazakhstan
Постановление Правительства Республики Казахстан от 28 сентября 2006 года № 932 - Об утверждении перечня объектов государственного природно-заповедного фонда республиканского значения

Lakes of Kazakhstan
Jambyl Region
Chu (river)